The Antakarana leaf chameleon, Brookesia antakarana, is a species of chameleon.

It is endemic to Madagascar.

References

Brookesia
Near threatened animals
Vulnerable biota of Africa
chameleon
chameleon
Reptiles described in 1995
Taxa named by Christopher John Raxworthy
Taxa named by Ronald Archie Nussbaum